Protet was one of six s built for the French Navy during the 1910s. The ship was condemned in 1933 and sold for scrap in 1933.

Design and description

The Bisson class were enlarged versions of the preceding  built to a more standardized design. Designed to displace , they displaced  at normal load. Their crew numbered 80–83 men.

Protet was powered by a pair of Parsons steam turbines, each driving one propeller shaft using steam provided by four Indret water-tube boilers.

The primary armament of the Bisson-class ships consisted of two  Modèle 1893 guns in single mounts, one each fore and aft of the superstructure, and four  Modèle 1902 guns distributed amidships. They were also fitted with two twin mounts for  torpedo tubes amidships.

Construction and career
Protet was ordered from the Arsenal de Rochefort and was launched on 15 October 1913. The ship was completed the following year. She was deployed in the Mediterranean Sea during World War I.

References

Bibliography

 

Bisson-class destroyers
Ships built in France
1913 ships